Lisker is a surname. Notable people with the surname include:

Bruce Lisker (born 1965), American man wrongly convicted of murder
Leigh Lisker (1918–2006), American linguist and phonetician

See also
Fisker (surname)
Nisker